Modra was a town of ancient Bithynia. According to Strabo, the town was situated in Phrygia Epictetus, at the sources of the river Gallus. This river flows down from the northern slope of the Bithynian Olympus, forming the boundary between Phrygia and Bithynia, Strabo must be mistaken, and Modra probably belonged to the southwest of Bithynia. It became the seat of a bishop; no longer a residential see it remains a titular see of the Roman Catholic Church. The district about Modra was called Modrene.
 
Its site is located near Mudurnu in Asiatic Turkey.

References

Populated places in Bithynia
Former populated places in Turkey
History of Bolu Province
Roman towns and cities in Turkey
Catholic titular sees in Asia
Mudurnu District
Populated places of the Byzantine Empire